Shamani Pradeepa Kumari Kiwuldeniye Herath Mudiyanselage (born 27 June 1976) is a Sri Lankan former sprinter. She competed in the women's 4 × 100 metres relay at the 2000 Summer Olympics.

References

External links
 

1976 births
Living people
Athletes (track and field) at the 2000 Summer Olympics
Sri Lankan female sprinters
Olympic athletes of Sri Lanka
Place of birth missing (living people)
Athletes (track and field) at the 1998 Asian Games
Asian Games competitors for Sri Lanka
Olympic female sprinters
20th-century Sri Lankan women
21st-century Sri Lankan women